The Portuguese Golden Ball (known in Portuguese as A Bola de Ouro) is an annual award given, by Portuguese newspaper A Bola, to the player who is adjudged to have been the best of the year in the Primeira Liga. The first winner of the award was Eusébio, in 1991. Initially, it was a career award, but since then, the award was given to the best player in the league.

Format
The prize is given out by Portuguese newspaper A Bola to the best player in the Portuguese Liga.

Winners

The award has been presented on 20 occasions as of 2012, with 17 different winners.

See also
CNID Footballer of the Year
SJPF Player of the Month
LPFP Primeira Liga Player of the Year

Notes

A.  It was a career award.
B.  In 1999 the Portuguese Golden Ball was not awarded.

References

External links
"A Bola" official website 

Portuguese football trophies and awards
1991 establishments in Portugal
Awards established in 1991
Annual events in Portugal